The Johanna River is a perennial river of the Corangamite catchment, located in the Otways region of the Australian state of Victoria.

Location and features
The Johanna River rises in the Otway Ranges in southwest Victoria, below , and flows generally south through the Great Otway National Park before reaching its river mouth and emptying into the Great Australian Bight, west of Cape Otway at Johanna Beach, near . From its highest point, the river descends  over its  course.

Etymology
The river, Johanna Beach and the surrounding locality of Johanna are named after the schooner Joanna, wrecked nearby on 22 September 1843.

See also

References

External links

 

Corangamite catchment
Rivers of Barwon South West (region)
Otway Ranges